The Château de Montcigoux is a château in the commune of Saint-Pierre-de-Frugie in Dordogne, France.

A house in the grounds incorporates the remains of a round tower from a 12th-century castle.

See also
 List of castles in France

Referenced

Châteaux in Dordogne